Dean Allen Kiekhefer (born June 7, 1989) is an American former professional baseball pitcher. He played in Major League Baseball (MLB) for the St. Louis Cardinals and Oakland Athletics between 2016 and 2018.

Career

St. Louis Cardinals
Kiekhefer was drafted by the Cleveland Indians in the 37th round of the 2007 Major League Baseball draft out of Oldham County High School in Buckner, Kentucky.  He did not sign with the Indians and played college baseball at the University of Louisville. In 2009, he played collegiate summer baseball with the Wareham Gatemen of the Cape Cod Baseball League. He was drafted by the St. Louis Cardinals in the 36th round of the 2010 Major League Baseball draft and signed.

After signing, Kiekhefer was assigned to the Johnson City Cardinals, and after one game, was promoted to the Quad Cities River Bandits where he finished the season with a 5.14 ERA in 28 innings pitched out of the bullpen. In 2011, he returned to Quad Cities where he pitched to a 4-1 record and 1.26 ERA in 57 relief innings, and in 2012 he played for the Palm Beach Cardinals where he was 2-2 with a 2.24 ERA in 46 relief appearances. He spent 2013 with Palm Beach and the Springfield Cardinals where he was a combined 4-5 with a 3.43 ERA in 36 games between both teams, 2014 with Springfield and the Memphis Redbirds where he posted a combined 2-5 record and 2.90 ERA in 55 relief appearances, and 2015 with Memphis where he was 2-1 with a 2.41 ERA in 50 games.

The Cardinals added him to their 40-man roster after the 2015 season. He began 2016 with Memphis.

The Cardinals called Kiekhefer up to the major league roster on May 13, 2016. The following day, he made his major league debut in Los Angeles in the sixth inning against the Dodgers, allowing no walks and striking out four in  innings.  The only hit and run charged to him—both firsts of his career—was a home run to Corey Seager. He was optioned to Memphis and recalled to St. Louis multiple times during the season before being recalled for the remainder of the season on August 29. In 29 appearances for Memphis he was 6-1 with a 2.08 ERA, and in 22 innings pitched for St. Louis he compiled a 5.32 ERA.

Seattle Mariners
Kiekhefer was claimed off waivers by the Seattle Mariners on November 4, 2016. He spent all of 2017 with the Tacoma Rainers where he pitched to a 3-3 record with a 4.47 ERA in 49 games. He elected free agency on November 6, 2017.

Cincinnati Reds
On February 17, 2018, Kiekhefer signed a minor league deal with the Cincinnati Reds. He began the season with the Pensacola Blue Wahoos. On April 30, he was released.

Oakland Athletics
On May 2, 2018, Kiekhefer signed a minor league deal with the Oakland Athletics. He began the season with the Midland RockHounds before being promoted to the Nashville Sounds. He was promoted to the major leagues on September 1, 2018. Kiekhefer elected free agency on October 15, 2018. He resigned a minor league deal on October 18, 2018. He became a free agent following the 2019 season.

Post-playing career
Kiekhefer announced his retirement from professional baseball on Twitter on November 7, 2019. He was hired by the Cardinals for the 2020 Season to be a minor league pitching coach for their State College (Short-Season A Ball). In 2021, he was reassigned to the Palm Beach Cardinals, their Low-A affiliate.

References

External links

Louisville Cardinals bio

1989 births
Living people
Oldham County High School alumni
Baseball players from Louisville, Kentucky
Major League Baseball pitchers
St. Louis Cardinals players
Oakland Athletics players
Louisville Cardinals baseball players
Wareham Gatemen players
Johnson City Cardinals players
Quad Cities River Bandits players
Palm Beach Cardinals players
Springfield Cardinals players
Salt River Rafters players
Memphis Redbirds players
Surprise Saguaros players
Tacoma Rainiers players
Pensacola Blue Wahoos players
Midland RockHounds players
Nashville Sounds players
Las Vegas Aviators players